Victor Backman (born 16 March 2001) is a Swedish football midfielder who plays for Örebro SK.

References

2001 births
Living people
Swedish footballers
Association football midfielders
Kalmar FF players
Allsvenskan players
Oskarshamns AIK players
Ettan Fotboll players
Örebro SK players
Superettan players